The FreeBSD Project is run by FreeBSD committers, or developers who have direct commit access to the master Git repository.  The FreeBSD Core Team exists to provide direction and is responsible for setting goals for the FreeBSD Project and to provide mediation in the event of disputes, and also takes the final decision in case of disagreement between individuals and teams involved in the project.  The Core Team is also responsible for selecting individuals for other teams related to the development and ongoing maintenance of FreeBSD, such as the Security Officer, the Release Engineering team, and the Port Manager team.  Finally, the Core Team also vote on nominations for new committers.  In the event of a breach of internal rules of conduct, it falls to the core team to decide on sanctions. The FreeBSD Core Team would be the equivalent of a board of directors, if the FreeBSD Project were a company.

The FreeBSD Core Team is the equivalent of a similar body in the NetBSD Project called the Core Group.

Current members
 John Baldwin
 Tobias C. Berner
 Baptiste Daroussin
 Li-Wen Hsu
 Greg Lehey
 Ed Maste
 Mateusz Piotrowski
 Benedict Reuschling
 Emmanuel Vadot

History and purpose
The FreeBSD Core Team began as an unofficial group of programmers, mainly consisting of those that initiated the FreeBSD Project itself.  There were eleven members, and new members could only join through invitation.

As the FreeBSD project grew, so did the Core Team.  By the year 2000, there were over 200 active committers, and the Core Team had expanded to 18 people.  Some Core members were completely inactive, others far less active than many non-members, and there were even accusations of cronyism.  The old, informal structure was no longer considered viable, and in early 2000 discussions were had regarding the future of the organisation.  A set of bylaws were formulated by Jonathan Lemon, Warner Losh and Wes Peters.  In a general vote by active committers on August 28, 2000, these bylaws passed by 117 votes to 5 against.

The FreeBSD Core Team is now an elected body comprising nine members from the pool of project developers with rights to directly change the Project repositories (committers).  Committers are entitled to vote in Core elections if they have made at least one change to one of the Project's repositories in the past 12 months.

The first election took place in September 2000.  Seventeen candidates stood for election, including eight of the existing Core Team.  Five were re-elected, alongside four new members.  Elections have taken place every two years since, the most recent election results being announced in May 2022.  Elections shall be held two years after the last vote, even if the previous election was early.  Elections may be held early if the membership of the Core Team fall below seven, or if petitioned for by 1/3 of active developers.  The bylaws may be changed by a 2/3 majority of committers if at least 50% of active committers participate in the vote.

The Core Team appoints a secretary at its own discretion.  This non-voting position exists to provide a central point of contact between external parties and the group, for keeping track of the agenda, and for acting as the interface between Core and other internal groups such as the Account Creation team.  The Core Team Secretary is also responsible for writing and distributing monthly status reports to the FreeBSD developer community. The current Core Team Secretary is Sergio Carlavilla Delgado.

Election procedure
The election lasts for five weeks.  During the first week, committers who wish to run for election announce their intention to do so.  In the four weeks that follow the application period, active committers vote for up to nine candidates.

After the voting period closes, votes are counted.  Ties are resolved by unambiguously elected candidates; for instance, if there is a tie for ninth place, the first eight decide which of the tied candidates will join the team.  The results are announced within one week of the end of the voting period, and the newly elected team enters office one week after the announcement.

List of members

See also
 FreeBSD
 Open-source software
 Free software

References

External links
 On being a Core Team member

FreeBSD